John "Bud" Cardos (December 20, 1929 – December 31, 2020) was an American film director, actor, and stuntman. His father and uncle managed Graumann's Egyptian and Chinese theaters. He made television guest appearances on The Monroes, The High Chaparral and NBC's Daniel Boone starring Fess Parker.

Cardos is the subject of the 2016 biography Action! by actor Robert Dix and his wife Lynette Dix. Robert Dix and Cardos starred together in the Al Adamson-directed biker film Satan's Sadists.

Cardos appeared as himself and talked about his stunt career in the documentary film Danger God, which is about his friend and fellow stuntman Gary Kent.

On December 31, 2020, Cardos died at his ranch in Acton, California, at the age of 91.

Filmography

Deadwood '76 (1965) - Hawk Russell
Hells Angels on Wheels (1967)
The Rebel Rousers (filmed in 1967, released in 1970) - Townsman
 The Road Hustlers (1968)
Psych-Out (1968) - Thug
Killers Three (1968) - Bates
Nightmare in Wax (1969) - Sergeant Carver
Blood of Dracula's Castle (1969)
Satan's Sadists (1969) - Firewater
Hell's Bloody Devils (1970)
The Female Bunch (1971) - Mexican Farmer (uncredited)
Breaking Point (1976)
 Kingdom of the Spiders (1977)
 The Dark (1979)
 The Day Time Ended (1979) - Director
 Mutant (1984)
 Outlaw of Gor (1988)
 Skeleton Coast (1988)
 Act of Piracy (1990)

TV Series
The Monroes (1967) as Wolf in "Ghost of Paradox"
Custer (1967) as Brave Bull in "Dangerous Prey"
The High Chaparral (1967) as Third Bandit in "The Terrorist"
Daniel Boone (1968) as Longknife in "The Dandy" and Tomochi in "Far Side of Fury"

References

External links

1929 births
2020 deaths
People from St. Louis
Film directors from Missouri